Borough, Block, and Lot (also called Borough/Block/Lot or BBL) is the parcel number system used to identify each unit of real estate in New York City for numerous city purposes.  It consists of three numbers, separated by slashes: the borough, which is 1 digit; the block number, which is up to 5 digits; and the lot number, which is up to 4 digits. 
 
The borough number is:
 Manhattan (New York County)
 Bronx (Bronx County)
 Brooklyn (Kings County)
 Queens (Queens County)
 Staten Island (Richmond County)

An example of a valid style of BBL is 4/99999/9999 for Queens.

See also
Lot and Block survey system

References

External links
 New York City Department of Finance Office of the City Register Lookup — provides conversions between Borough/Block/Lot and property address, and documents related to each parcel
 Property Address Search — displays the block and lot of a property once the borough and street address are known

Geography of New York City
Government of New York City
Surveying of the United States
Land surveying systems
New York City infrastructure
Real estate in the United States
Real estate terminology